Roman Smoluchowski (born 31 August 1910 in Zakopane; died 12 January 1996 in Austin, Texas) was a notable physicist who worked in Poland, and after World War II settled in Institute for Advanced Study in Princeton, New Jersey. He was the son of the statistical physics pioneer Marian Smoluchowski. In 1974, Roman Smoluchowski was awarded a Guggenheim Fellowship. In 1984, the minor planet 4530 Smoluchowski was named after him.

References

1910 births
1996 deaths
20th-century Polish physicists
20th-century American physicists
Fellows of the American Physical Society